Hassan Djamous (died April 1989) was a Commander-in-Chief of the military of Chad and a cousin of Chadian President Idriss Déby.

He led Chadian forces during the Chadian–Libyan conflict, such as the victory in the Battle of Maaten al-Sarra. According to military analyst Kenneth M. Pollack, Djamous was a capable commander whose mastery of maneuver warfare earned him comparisons with World War II German general Erwin Rommel.

Djamous was killed on orders of then-President Hissène Habré, who suspected him of plotting a coup d'état along with his cousin, Déby, and Mahamat Itno, Minister of the Interior; Déby was the only one of the three who survived.

References 

Chadian military leaders
Year of birth missing
1989 deaths
People of the Chadian–Libyan War
Executed Chadian people
People executed by Chad